is a passenger railway station located in the city of  Katsuura, Chiba Prefecture, Japan operated by the East Japan Railway Company (JR East).

Lines

Station layout
Kazusa-Okitsu Station has two opposed side platforms connected to a wooden station building by a footbridge. The station is staffed.

Platform

History
Kazusa-Okitsu Station was opened on 1 April 1927. It was absorbed into the JR East network upon the privatization of the Japan National Railways (JNR) on 1 April 1987.

Passenger statistics
In fiscal 2019, the station was used by an average of 182 passengers daily (boarding passengers only).

Surrounding area
 
 Okitsu Port

See also
 List of railway stations in Japan

References

External links

 JR East Station information 

Railway stations in Japan opened in 1927
Railway stations in Chiba Prefecture
Sotobō Line
Katsuura, Chiba